János Szabó (born 1 June 1941 in Füzesabony) is a Hungarian politician, who served as Minister of Defence between 1998 and 2002.

In 1965, he graduated from the Faculty of Law of the Eötvös Loránd University.

References

1941 births
Living people
People from Heves County
Defence ministers of Hungary
Members of the National Assembly of Hungary (1994–1998)
Members of the National Assembly of Hungary (1998–2002)